Širola is a surname. Notable people with the surname include:

 Božidar Širola (1889–1956), Croatian composer and musicologist
 Dorjana Širola (born 1972), Croatian female quizzer, linguist,  and anglicist

Croatian surnames